1963–64 Hertha BSC season was the 91st season in club history. Hertha BSC participated in the inaugural Bundesliga season.

Review and events
Hertha BSC participated and finished 14th out of 16 clubs in the inaugural Bundesliga season.

Match results

Legend

Bundesliga

DFB-Pokal

Inter-Cities Fairs Cup

Player information

Transfers

Squad & statistics

Coaching staff

Awards

See also
1963–64 Bundesliga
1963–64 Inter-Cities Fairs Cup
1963–64 DFB-Pokal
Hertha BSC

Sources

Match reports

Other sources

External links

Hertha BSC seasons
Hertha BSC